That's How Rumors Get Started is the third studio album by American country musician Margo Price. The album was planned for release on May 8, 2020, by Loma Vista Recordings, but was postponed due to the COVID-19 pandemic. The album was produced by Sturgill Simpson, with David R. Ferguson and Price serving as co-producers on the album with Simpson. The album was released on July 10, 2020. On April 22, 2022, a deluxe version of the album was released with 8 bonus tracks.

Price was also scheduled to tour in promotion of the album, with some dates in support of Chris Stapleton's 2020 "All-American Road Show Tour," but those were also postponed.

Track listing

Critical reception

That's How Rumors Get Started was met with positive reviews. At Metacritic, which assigns a normalized rating out of 100 to reviews from professional critics, the album received an average score of 81, based on 16 reviews. The aggregator AnyDecentMusic? has the critical consensus of the album at a 7.5 out of 10.

Alexis Petridis of The Guardian says “Margo Price has got the talent to take on whatever the future holds."

Accolades

Charts

References

2020 albums
Margo Price albums
Loma Vista Recordings albums
Albums postponed due to the COVID-19 pandemic
Albums produced by Sturgill Simpson